
Great Hallingbury is a village and a civil parish in the Uttlesford District of Essex, England. The population of the civil parish at the 2011 census was 713.  It is near the town of Bishop's Stortford, and the M11 motorway.

Great Hallingbury contains houses from the Tudor period to modern. Decrease in population has resulted in the closure of the village school; its building and its accompanying playing field still exist, but are converted to housing and a grazing field.

Great Hallingbury has a church dedicated to St Giles. Village groups include a Brownie club and the WI which meet in the Village Hall. There is an annual flower show organised by either Great Hallingbury or Little Hallingbury.

William Parker, 4th Baron Monteagle, best known for his role in the discovery of the Gunpowder Plot, died in the village on 1 July 1622.

At the edge of the village is the ancient Royal Hunting Forest and National Trust property Hatfield Forest. On 22 December 1999, Korean Air Cargo Flight 8509 crashed into the Forest near Great Hallingbury shortly after take-off from nearby London Stansted Airport. All four crew on board were killed.

See also
Start Hill, Essex
The Hundred Parishes

References

External links

Villages in Essex
Civil parishes in Essex
Uttlesford